Nadia et Sarra, is a 2006 Franco-Tunisian drama film directed by Moufida Tlatli and produced by Ephraim Gordon. The film stars Hiam Abbass and Dorra Zarrouk in the lead roles whereas Hichem Rostom, Nejia Ouerghi, Nadia Saiji, Mohamed Ali Ben Jemaa and Nidhal Guiga made supportive roles. The film deals with Nadia, a 47-year-old Tunisian professor and her enters struggling with menopause.

The film has been shot in Tunis, Tunisia. The film made its premier on 20 June 2006 in France. The film received mixed reviews from critics.

Cast
 Hiam Abbass as Nadia
 Dorra Zarrouk as Sarra 
 Hichem Rostom as Hedi
 Nejia Ouerghi as Om El Khir
 Nadia Saiji as Leila
 Mohamed Ali Ben Jemaa as Majid
 Nidhal Guiga as Dalila 
 Serge Meddeb as Tarak
 Samia Ayari as Gynécologue
 Martine Gafsi as Soraya
 M'Hamed Ali Grandi as Directeur
 Haifa Bouzouita as Danseuse
 Elyes Messaed as Professeur de gymnastique 
 Leila Ben Hamida as Jeune fille 1
 Ahlem Cheffi as Jeune fille 2
 Mohamed Bechir Snoussi as Jeune lycéem
 Mourad Toumi as Docteur Selmi
 Adel Cherif as Chauffeur de taxi
 Taoufik Ayeb as Homme Avenue
 Leila Rokbani as Vendeuse
 Wassila Dari as Ouvreuse
 Naejib Khalfallah as Serveur du café
 Hafedh Dakhlaoui as Rayan

References

External links 
 

2006 films
Tunisian drama films
2006 multilingual films
French drama films
2000s French films